Sergei Obukhov (born 5 October 1958) is the secretary of the central committee of the Communist Party of the Russian Federation and a deputy of the State Duma of the Federal Assembly of the Russian Federation of the 5th and 6th convocation (Moscow). He is also a member of the State Duma Committee for public associations and religious organizations.

He is one of the 324 members of the State Duma the United States Treasury sanctioned on 24 March 2022 in response to the 2022 Russian invasion of Ukraine.

References 

Living people
1958 births
Russian communists
Communist Party of the Russian Federation members
21st-century Russian politicians
Fifth convocation members of the State Duma (Russian Federation)
Sixth convocation members of the State Duma (Russian Federation)
Eighth convocation members of the State Duma (Russian Federation)
Russian individuals subject to the U.S. Department of the Treasury sanctions